The following is a list of Divisions of the Imperial German Army.

Background

Standing armies

Guards
 1st Guards Infantry
 2nd Guards Infantry
 Cavalry

Regular

 1st
 2nd
 3rd
 4th
 5th
 6th
 7th
 8th
 9th
 10th
 11th
 12th
 13th
 14th
 15th
 16th
 17th
 18th
 19th
 20th
 21st
 22nd
 23rd 
 24th
 25th 
 26th
 27th
 28th
 29th
 30th
 31st
 32nd
 33rd
 34th
 35th
 36th
 37th
 38th
 39th
 40th
 41st
 42nd

Bavarian
 1st
 2nd
 3rd
 4th
 5th
 6th

Raised in World War I

Guards
 3rd Guards Infantry
 4th Guards Infantry
 5th Guards Infantry
 1st Guards Reserve
 2nd Guards Reserve 
 Guards Ersatz

Cavalry
 1st
 2nd
 3rd
 4th
 5th
 6th
 7th
 8th
 9th
 Bavarian

Infantry

 50th
 52nd
 54th
 56th
 58th
 83rd
 84th
 86th
 87th
 88th
 89th
 91st
 92nd
 93rd
 94th
 95th
 96th
 101st
 103rd
 105th
 107th
 108th
 109th
 111th
 113th
 115th
 117th
 119th
 121st
 123rd
 183rd
 185th
 187th
 192nd
 195th
 197th
 199th
 200th
 201st
 202nd
 203rd
 204th 
 205th
 206th
 207th
 208th
 211th
 212th
 213th
 214th
 215th
 216th
 217th
 218th
 219th
 220th
 221st
 222nd
 223rd
 224th
 225th
 226th
 227th
 228th
 231st
 232nd
 233rd
 234th
 235th
 236th
 237th
 238th
 239th
 240th
 241st
 242nd 
 243rd
 255th
 301st
 302nd
 303rd

Reserve

 1st
 3rd
 5th
 6th
 7th
 9th
 10th	
 11th	
 12th
 13th
 14th
 15th
 16th
 17th
 18th
 19th
 21st
 22nd
 23rd
 24th
 25th
 26th 
 28th
 30th (Bavarian)
 33rd
 35th
 36th
 39th (Bavarian)
 43rd
 44th
 45th
 46th
 47th
 48th
 49th
 50th
 51st
 52nd
 53rd
 54th
 75th
 76th
 77th
 78th
 79th
 80th
 81st
 82nd

Landwehr

 1st
 2nd
 3rd
 4th
 5th
 7th
 8th
 9th
 10th
 11th
 12th
 13th
 14th
 15th
 16th
 17th
 18th
 19th
 20th
 21st
 22nd
 23rd
 25th
 26th
 38th
 44th
 45th 
 46th 
 47th 
 48th
 85th

Ersatz
 4th
 5th
 8th
 10th
 19th

Naval
 Naval
 1st
 2nd
 3rd

Bavarian infantry
 10th
 11th
 12th
 14th
 15th
 16th

Bavarian reserve
 1st
 5th
 6th
 8th
 9th
 30th
 39th

Bavarian Landwehr and Ersatz
 1st
 2nd
 6th
 Ersatz

Other
 Alpenkorps
 Deutsche Jäger
 Ostsee (Baltic Sea)

See also
German Army (German Empire)
List of Corps of the Imperial German Army
World War I

German Army (German Empire)
Divisions of Germany